The Turbo Charged Prelude for 2 Fast 2 Furious (also known simply as Turbo Charged Prelude) is a 2003 American short film directed by Philip G. Atwell and written by Keith Dinielli. It is the first short film in the Fast & Furious franchise and is a follow-up to The Fast and the Furious (2001) and prequel to 2 Fast 2 Furious (2003). It stars Paul Walker. In the film, Brian O'Conner (Walker) leaves Los Angeles to evade police capture.

Development for Turbo Charged Prelude began after Vin Diesel, who starred in the original film, was confirmed not to appear in 2 Fast 2 Furious. Aside from archival footage from its predecessor, Turbo Charged Prelude is mostly a silent film, featuring no original dialogue. Filming occurred in Los Angeles and Miami. 

Turbo Charged Prelude was first released by Universal Pictures on June 3, 2003, having a limited theatrical release in the United States to tie with 2 Fast 2 Furious. It was later included on special edition home releases of the first film.

Plot
Brian O'Conner packs his bags and leaves Los Angeles, before the LAPD gets a chance to arrest him for letting Dominic Toretto escape. While the FBI launch a national manhunt for him, Brian travels across Arizona, New Mexico, and Texas in a 1991 Dodge Stealth, winning street races along the way for money. 

Brian is forced to abandon the car at a motel in San Antonio when police officers are notified of his presence. When they collect the car, he manages to hitch a ride from an unknown woman. She drops him at a used car lot, with him realizing she knows that he is a wanted man. There, Brian buys a green Nissan Skyline GT-R R34. Later, collecting money from street races, he modifies the car before traveling eastbound and winning more races. Brian continues across country until he reaches Miami, where he sees a modified Toyota Supra and Mazda RX-7 before the screen reads "2 be continued...".

Cast
 Paul Walker as Brian O'Conner, a fugitive travelling across the United States on the run from the law.

The short film also features archival footage of Vin Diesel as Dominic Toretto from the first film, and Peter Aylward and Rodney Neil have cameo appearances as police officers. Minka Kelly acts as the woman who gave Brian a ride to San Antonio.

Notes

External links
 

2003 short films
2003 films
2003 action thriller films
American action thriller films
American crime thriller films
American road movies
American silent short films
Direct-to-video interquel films
Fast & Furious mass media
Films about automobiles
Films set in Los Angeles
Films set in Louisiana
Films set in Miami
Films set in New Mexico
Films set in Phoenix, Arizona
Films set in San Antonio
Films shot in Los Angeles
Films shot in Miami
Universal Pictures short films
2000s American films
Silent thriller films